There are eight colleges and universities in Delaware. These institutions include two research universities, one master's university, one baccalaureate college, two associate's colleges, and two special-focus institutions. Five of Delaware's post-secondary institutions are private and three are public.

Delaware's oldest post-secondary institution is the University of Delaware, which was chartered by the Delaware General Assembly as a degree-granting college in 1833. The University of Delaware is also the state's largest institution of higher learning in terms of enrollment, as it had 23,009 students as of late 2014. According to the United States Department of Education Institute of Education Sciences, the Delaware College of Art and Design is the state's smallest institution of higher learning with an enrollment of 170. Wilmington University is Delaware's largest private post-secondary institution, with an enrollment of 15,316.

Delaware has two land-grant universities: Delaware State University and the University of Delaware. The University of Delaware is also the state's sole participant in the National Sea Grant College Program and the National Space Grant College and Fellowship Program. In addition, Delaware State University is the one historically black college and university in the state, and is a member of the Thurgood Marshall College Fund. Delaware previously had two private post-secondary institutions for men and women respectively: St. Mary's College and Wesleyan Female College respectively.

The state does not have a medical school, but the Delaware Institute of Medical Education and Research reserves spaces for Delaware students at two medical schools in Philadelphia. Delaware has one law school, Widener University Delaware Law School. All eight of Delaware's post-secondary institutions are regionally accredited by the Middle States Commission on Higher Education.

Extant institutions

Defunct institutions

See also
 List of college athletic programs in Delaware
 Higher education in the United States
 List of recognized higher education accreditation organizations
 Lists of American institutions of higher education

References
Explanatory notes

Citations

External links
 
 United States Department of Education listing of accredited institutions in Delaware

Lists of universities and colleges by U.S. state

Universities and colleges